is a 1995 Japanese horror television film based on the novel of the same title by Koji Suzuki. In comparison to the subsequent theatrical films and television series based on the novel, it is the most accurate in relation to the original text.

Release
The film premiered on the Japanese television station Fuji TV on August 11, 1995 as Ring. The film has only been released in Japan, and has not seen a home video re-release since 1996.

Cast
 Katsunori Takahashi as Kazuyuki Asakawa
 Yoshio Harada as Ryūji Takayama
 Ayane Miura as Sadako Yamamura
 Kyōko Dōnowaki as Shizuko Yamamura
 Mai Tachihara as Shizuka Asakawa
 Akiko Hinagata as Tomoko Ōishi
 Maha Hamada as Mai Takano
 Tomorowo Taguchi as Jōtarō Nagao
 Tadayoshi Ueda as Takashi Yamamura

References

Bibliography

External links 
 

1995 films
1995 horror films
1995 television films
1990s Japanese-language films
Films set in the 1990s
Horror television films
Japanese horror films
Japanese television films
Television films based on books
The Ring (franchise)
1990s Japanese films